Frijoles negros ( in Spanish) is a Latin American dish made with black beans, prepared in Guatemala, Cuba, Venezuela (where it is called caraotas negras), Puerto Rico, Mexico, and other nations in Latin America. The black bean, a legume of the species Phaseolus vulgaris, is usually purchased in either canned or dried form. One cup of dried black beans yields approximately  cups of cooked beans. Black bean soup (sopa de frijoles negros) is another commonly prepared Cuban favorite.

Frijoles negros is typically seasoned with salt, ham hocks, onions and garlic, tomatoes, powdered cumin seeds, oregano and vinegar.

Nutrition

Black beans are high in folate (256 μg), iron (3.61 mg), magnesium (120 mg), and phosphorus (241 mg); they are also a source of zinc (1.92 mg), niacin (2 mg), and thiamine (0.42 mg)—based on 1 cup portion size.  Black beans are very high in soluble fiber.

Glycemic response
The glycemic response is not well understood.  Black beans have a low glycemic index. Black beans lessen the effects of other foods that have rank very high on the glycemic index.

See also
 List of legume dishes
 Phaseolus vulgaris

References

Legume dishes
Guatemalan cuisine
Cuban cuisine
Mexican cuisine
Venezuelan cuisine